Joseph Hallett may refer to:
 Joseph Hallett II (1656–1722), English nonconformist minister and dissenting academy tutor 
 Joseph Hallett III (c. 1691–1744), his son, English nonconformist minister and author